The 1930 Connecticut Aggies football team represented Connecticut Agricultural College, now the University of Connecticut, in the 1930 college football season.  The Aggies were led by eighth year head coach Sumner Dole, and completed the season with a record of 1–5–1.

Schedule

References

Connecticut
UConn Huskies football seasons
Connecticut Aggies football